Sindhu Bath is a 1995 Tamil-language drama film directed by Balu Anand. The film stars Mansoor Ali Khan, Kasthuri and Sanghavi, with R. Sundarrajan, Senthil, Rajan P. Dev, Kovai Sarala and Jai Ganesh playing supporting roles. It was released on 15 September 1995.

Plot

The film begins with Mayilsamy getting released from jail. Mayilsamy then finds himself caught up in a bank robbery. The building is surrounded by the police, the robber Muthu then threatens to shoot Mayilsamy if Mayilsamy refuses to act as a robber. Muthu manages to escape from the police but Mayilsamy catches him and forces him to surrender to the police. At the police station, Muthu tells him that he stole this money for a good cause and begs him to save him. Mayilsamy and Muthu then run away from the police station but they have lost the suitcase full of money.

Being sought by the police, Muthu offers him to stay in his boss' house for a few days. Muthu tells Mayilsamy that he steals the money to arrange the marriage between his boss' daughter Shobana and her boyfriend. Bhama, a small-time crook, enters Shobana's house and claims to be Shobana's grandmother. Mayilsamy and Shobana are now forced to act as husband and wife. Afterwards, their drama took a sharp turn for the worse, when Mayilsamy discovers that Shobana's father is Sarangan.

In the past, Mayilsamy was a poor bangle seller in his village. Mayilsamy and the village belle Kannatha were madly in love with each other. When her father Rasu Gounder, a rich landlord, learnt about the love affair between Kannatha and a bangle seller, he locked up his daughter in her room. The politician Sarangan then promised Mayilsamy to arrange his wedding with Kannatha if he stole the gold jewels from the village temple. As promised, Mayilsamy brought him the jewels but later, Sarangan betrayed him and fled with the jewels. The next day, Kannatha committed suicide and the innocent Mayilsamy was arrested for stealing the temple jewels.

Back to the present, Mayilsamy is determined to take revenge on Sarangan, who is now a minister. What transpires next forms the rest of the story.

Cast

Mansoor Ali Khan as Mayilsamy
Kasthuri as Shobana
Sanghavi as Kannatha
R. Sundarrajan as Muthu
Senthil
Rajan P. Dev as Sarangan
Kovai Sarala as Bhama
Jai Ganesh as Rasu Gounder
Ra. Sankaran as Doctor
Krishnamoorthy as Shankaran
M. C. Nadrajan
B. Ashokarajan
Joker Thulasi
Nellai Siva
Karnan as Rajini
Radha Rani

Soundtrack

The film score and the soundtrack were composed by Deva. The soundtrack, released in 1995, features 5 tracks with lyrics written by Vairamuthu and T. M. Jayamurugan.

References

1995 films
1990s Tamil-language films
Indian drama films
Films scored by Deva (composer)
Films directed by Balu Anand
1995 drama films